Jan Svátek (born 24 May 1983 in Prague) is a Czech footballer (striker) playing currently for FK Jablonec 97.

External links
 

1983 births
Living people
Czech footballers
FC Viktoria Plzeň players
FK Jablonec players
SK Dynamo České Budějovice players
SFC Opava players
Association football forwards
FC Sellier & Bellot Vlašim players
Czech First League players
Footballers from Prague